Anefif or Anéfis is a Saharan village and commune in the Cercle of Kidal in the Kidal Region of north-eastern Mali.

Geography 
Anefif is located on the Tessalit Trail. In 2009 the commune had a population of 5,087.

There are multiple rocks and stones made from volcanic material.

History 
In 2013, the Malian Military attacked Tuareg rebels living in the village. The war was highly criticized by the military, and the press, who claimed that it was too invasive and violent.

Climate 
The commune has a Saharian climate and is too dry for rain-fed agriculture. The annual rainfall of around 150 mm occurs between late June and early September.

Kel Adagh 
There are many Kel Adagh in the area, along with multiple small clans.

Notable people 

 Abdullah Senussi - Head of Libyan Military Intelligence (born 1949).

References

External links
.

Communes of Kidal Region